Stanley Shaw Bond (8 July 1877 - 1943) was the owner of legal publishers Butterworth and Co, who "introduced professionalism into law publishing". He was the son of Charles Bond. He was responsible for the creation of Halsbury's Laws of England in 1907.

References

Further reading
Obituary in The Law Journal, Volume 93 (1943), p. 57.

English publishers (people)
1877 births
1943 deaths